This is part of the series of violence between minorities in the SNNPR and West Guji Zone of the Oromia regions, causing frequent attacks against ethnic Koore and other minorities in the Amaro special woreda and surroundings. EHRC underscored the increasingly frequent nature and spread of conflicts and security issues in the area and called for preventative measures.

Background and events of the conflict
This section lists the background on the frequent conflicts that occurred in disputed administrative lands shared between the SNNPR and Oromia regions, which is often referred to as West Guji.

References

See also 
 Ethnic violence in Konso
 Human rights in Ethiopia
 Democratic backsliding in Ethiopia
 Gambela massacre

Ethnicity-based civil wars
2020s in Ethiopia
Ethiopian civil conflict (2018–present)
1990s in Ethiopia
2000s in Ethiopia
2010s in Ethiopia